Bai Guang (27 June 1921 – 27 August 1999), also credited as Pai Kwong, Bai Kwong and Bai Kwang, was a Chinese actress and singer. By the 1940s, she became one of the Seven great singing stars.

Biography
Bai Guang was born Shi Yongfen in 1921 in  Zhuozhou, Hebei. Her father was a quartermaster under general Shang Zhen. In her early years, she was a student of the Beiping Salon Theatrical Troupe, and once performed Cao Yu's play "Sunrise".   In 1937, she studied at the University of Tokyo's music department until World War II in 1942. After drama school, she wanted to be a movie star. As she proclaimed, she wanted to be like the beams of light coming off the movie projectors onto the big screen.  Hence, her stage name was Bai Guang, which translated to "White Light".

Career
Her mandopop songs were often used in many of her movies as soundtracks.  In an age and culture where light, higher voices were usually favored, she had a slightly deep and hoarse voice, which helped her become a big star in Shanghai.  People called her the "Queen of the Low Voice".

Bai's big screen career started in 1943. She was known for playing seductive roles due to her flirtatious image on screen and has also played villains at times.  She lent a more dramatic tone or sexy attitude to her songs.  Some of her hits are "Autumn Evening", "Without You", "The Pretender", "Revisiting Old Dreams", and "Waiting For You".

After the war, Bai Guang moved to Hong Kong and joined Great Wall Pictures. In 1949, A Forgotten Woman was shown in Hong Kong.  Even the governor, Alexander Grantham, went as a fan.

By 1950 Bai tired of the low-quality films she was given and retired as an actress in China.  After marrying an American GI in 1951, she lived in Japan and successfully opened a nightclub in Tokyo's Ginza District in 1953.  The union did not last, and she returned to Hong Kong, recording some music through 1959 when she officially retired.  In 1969 she resettled in Kuala Lumpur, Malaysia, where she married a man 20 years her junior.  She performed to wide acclaim in 1979 in Kaohsiung, Taiwan.  Her last public appearance was in 1995 at Hong Kong's TV top 10 Chinese singer award presentation.On 27 August 1999 she died in her house at Kuala Lumpur's Damansara Heights suburb due to colon cancer at the age of 78. She was buried at the Nirvana Memorial Park.

Filmography
 Love Peas of Southland (1943)
 The Fire of Love (1945)
 Sinister House #13 (1947)
 Spy Ring 626 (1948)
 Blood Stained Begonia (1949)
 A Forgotten Woman (1949)
 Songs in the Rainy Nights (1950)
 A Strange Woman (1950)
 Hours Passed the Wedding (1950)
 Smiling Rose (1951)
 Tears of Songstress (1953)
 Fresh Peony (1956)

References

External links

 
 Bai Guang songs online
 
 
 
 Actress at China's Movie Database

1921 births
1999 deaths
Actresses from Beijing
Singers from Beijing
Chinese film actresses
20th-century Chinese actresses
Deaths from colorectal cancer
Deaths from cancer in Malaysia
20th-century Chinese women singers 
Chinese Civil War refugees
Chinese emigrants to Malaysia
Pathé Records (China) artists